Debao railway station is a railway station in Debao County, Baise, Guangxi, China.

History
Freight service began on 23 July 2010 with the opening of the Tiandong–Debao railway. Passenger services were introduced on 29 January 2016. The initial service level was four trains per day to Jingxi and four trains per day to Nanning.

References

Railway stations in Guangxi
Railway stations in China opened in 2010